Pioneer Girl may refer to:

 Pioneer Girl, a 1982 novel by Margaret Pemberton, also issued as A Many-Splendoured Thing
 Pioneer Girl (Nguyen novel), a 2014 novel by Bich Minh Nguyen
 Pioneer Girl: The Annotated Autobiography, an autobiography by Laura Ingalls Wilder, annotated and published in 2014
 Pioneer Girl, The Early Life of Frances Willard, illustrated by Genevieve Foster
 Pioneer Girl: Growing Up on the Prairie, a 1998 biography of American quilter Grace Snyder by Andrea Warren

See also
 Sallie Fox: The Story of a Pioneer Girl, a 1995 children's book about California pioneer Sallie Fox
 Pioneer Girls, a youth organization